John Benjamin Myhers (December 18, 1921 – May 27, 1992) was an American stage and screen actor. His film roles included playing Mr. Bratt in the film adaptation of the Broadway musical How to Succeed in Business Without Really Trying (1967), Robert Livingston in the 1972 film adaptation of the Broadway musical 1776, and as the leader of the Roman Senate in Mel Brooks' History of the World, Part I (1981).

Early life and education 
Myhers was born in Strum, Wisconsin, the son of Ole Myhers (1896–1941) and Mabel (née Borreson) Myhers (1902–1964), who later married Hal DeRoach. Myhers began singing at the age of 12 and won several leading roles in the St. Paul Civic Opera during his student years at McPhail School of Music in St. Paul. He served in the United States armed forces in Italy during World War II and stayed in Rome for 11 years after the war. He studied at the American Academy and earned a doctoral degree in literature from the University of Rome.

Career

Theatre 
He performed leading roles in Broadway shows such as Kiss Me Kate, The Golden Fleecing and The Good Soup, and most notably played the role of Captain Von Trapp in the First National Touring Company of The Sound of Music in the early 1960s and later. He played opposite Katharine Hepburn in a Stratford, Connecticut production of Antony and Cleopatra. He also appeared opposite actors such as Jack Lemmon and Charlton Heston in theatrical plays across the country.

Film 
His most notable film role was playing Bert O. Bratt in the film adaptation of How to Succeed in Business Without Really Trying. He played Robert Livingston in 1776 (he also played the role in the Broadway musical version), and also appeared in Mel Brooks' History of the World, Part I as the leader of the Roman Senate. Other film credits include Quo Vadis, Willard, Weddings and Babies, and several Disney movies (including Treasure of Matecumbe, The Shaggy D.A. and Now You See Him, Now You Don't).

Television 
Myhers also had a robust career on television, appearing on shows like Get Smart, Hogan's Heroes, The Mothers-in-Law, I Dream of Jeannie, Love, American Style, Alice,  The Waltons and Fantasy Island. He was also the voice of Hector Heathcote on The Hector Heathcote Show in 1961, and in a series of animated shorts that ran from 1959 to 1971. His last acting appearance was in 1985 on The Twilight Zone in the episode "Ye Gods".

Personal life and death 
Myhers was married to Joan Benedict from 1962 to his death in 1992. Myhers died of pneumonia on May 27, 1992 in Los Angeles, California, at Cedars-Sinai Medical Center. He is also survived by his daughter Claudia Myhers Tschudin. He is buried at Forest Lawn Memorial Park-Hollywood Hills.

Partial filmography

La vendetta del corsaro (1951)
Quo Vadis (1951) as Guard (uncredited)
O.K. Nero! (1951)
The Small Miracle (1951)
Weddings and Babies (1958) as Al
Saturday Night in Apple Valley (1965)
How to Succeed in Business Without Really Trying (1967) as Bert O. Bratt
The Wicked Dreams of Paula Schultz (1968) as Boss
The Private Navy of Sgt. O'Farrell (1968) as Lt. Cmdr. Roger Snavely
2000 Years Later (1969) as Air Force General
Willard (1971) as Carlson
Now You See Him, Now You Don't (1972) as Golfer
1776 (1972) as Robert Livingston (NY)
Snowball Express (1972) as Mr. Manescue
Awake and Sing! (1972 PBS - TV) as Schlosser
Walking Tall (1973) as Lester Dickens
Herbie Rides Again (1974) as Announcer at San Francisco's Office of the President
The Strongest Man in the World (1975) as Mr. Roscoe
Linda Lovelace for President (1975) as Billy Leroy Boy
Train Ride to Hollywood (1975) as Sheik
Street People (1976) as Francis (uncredited)
Treasure of Matecumbe (1976) as Captain Boomer
The Shaggy D.A. (1976) as Adm. Brenner
The Happy Hooker Goes to Washington (1977) as Donald Axelrod
The Billion Dollar Hobo (1977) as Cox
The Prize Fighter (1979) as Doyle
History of the World, Part I (1981) as Leader of Senate (The Roman Empire)

References

External links
 
 
 
 

1921 births
1992 deaths
People from Eau Claire, Wisconsin
Male actors from California
Male actors from Wisconsin
American male film actors
American male stage actors
American male television actors
Burials at Forest Lawn Memorial Park (Hollywood Hills)
20th-century American male actors
Deaths from pneumonia in California